Sakson is a surname. Notable people with the surname include:

Andrzej Sakson (born 1950), Polish sociologist and historian
Vladimir Sakson (1927–1988), Soviet Russian artist

See also
Samson (name)
Saxon (surname)